Woolwich Arsenal station is a National Rail and Docklands Light Railway (DLR) paired interchange station in the heart of Woolwich in the Royal Borough of Greenwich. It has two parts; its raised, south-western part of the station is on the semi-slow, commuter service, corollary of the North Kent Line and also in its Dartford Loop services section between London and Dartford, run by Southeastern. Regular services beyond Dartford are to the Medway Towns, which start/finish in the opposite direction at Luton via the City of London, West Hampstead and St Albans. Its other part is the terminus of its own branch of the DLR, run by Transport for London.

The older part of the station, built in a modernist style, is located on a corner of General Gordon Square, a green town square. The newer part has entrances to Woolwich's subterranean end of the DLR, and faces the top of Powis Street, a long, semi-pedestrianised retail avenue. It is named after the area's Woolwich or Royal Arsenal, to distinguish the Arsenal site from the former Royal Dockyard, which before the 19th century was complemented  with wharves and yards for large naval ships. In zoning it is the furthest DLR station – in Travelcard Zone 4.

History
The station opened in 1849, serving the North Kent Line from London to Gillingham. The station building was rebuilt in 1906 in a London brick form typical of southeast London. It was again rebuilt in 1992–93 to a modern design in steel and glass by the Architecture and Design Group of British Rail, under the leadership of Nick Derbyshire. It has a, clean, naturally-lit ellipsoid theme, contrasting with the earlier forms.

In 1973 a government report on the redevelopment of London's Docklands projected a greater form of the never-built "Fleet line" from Charing Cross via Fenchurch Street to Woolwich Arsenal and on towards Thamesmead, with a preceding stop at Silvertown. The Fleet line plans were shelved in favour of a route that became the western part of the Jubilee line. Council (local government)-approved however in 1980, finances meant that the Fleet line was never built. By the start of the 1990s plans emerged in both levels of government and business forums for the Jubilee Line Extension to serve the south bank of the Thames twice on its way to Stratford. In the Royal Borough of Greenwich the line takes in a small area, North Greenwich (a peninsula).

Woolwich Arsenal was expanded in 2009, when Transport for London completed the construction of an extension of what was then termed the London City Airport branch of the Docklands Light Railway from King George V to Woolwich Arsenal. The official opening took place on 12 January that year.

In 2014, a petition was started and presented to the Mayor of London, Boris Johnson, to rezone Woolwich Arsenal station from Zone 4 to Zone 3. However he ruled this out, stating it would cause losses of over a million pounds a year.

Accidents and incidents
On 18 November 1948, a train – an electric multiple unit – crashed into the rear of another train, killing two people. It had departed from  against signals.

Design

The National Rail part of the station consists of two above-ground platforms. The up platform for London has a refreshment facility. The down platform serves trains going east, towards north Kent, via Plumstead, Abbey Wood and Slade Green.

The Docklands Light Railway part of the station is underground, and consists of two platforms in an island platform configuration. As Woolwich Arsenal is a terminus, both platforms serve an up line to Bank or Stratford International via London City Airport and Canning Town. Trains depart in the eastbound direction due to the curve under the River Thames.

Connections
London Buses routes 51, 53, 54, 96, 99, 122, 161, 177, 178, 180, 244, 291, 301, 380, 386, 422, 469, 472, school route 658 and night routes N1 and N53 serve the station.

Crossrail station at the former Royal Arsenal base

In May 2022 a Crossrail station opened in north-east Woolwich, after a campaign to complement housing developments built on former public-sector land. Among the successful lobbyists for this extra station were those who developed the land, including Berkeley Homes. It is about 200m north of the Woolwich Arsenal station on the north side of the A206 road.

Services

National Rail

The typical off-peak service in trains per hour is:
 4 tph to London Cannon Street (2 of these run via  and 2 run via )
 2 tph to  via Greenwich 
 2 tph to 
 2 tph to  via 

During the peak hours, the station is served by an additional half-hourly circular service to and from London Cannon Street via  and Lewisham in the clockwise direction and via Greenwich in the anticlockwise direction.

DLR
The typical DLR service in trains per hour is:
 6 tph to Bank
 6 tph to

References

External links

Docklands Light Railway stations in the Royal Borough of Greenwich
Railway stations in the Royal Borough of Greenwich
Former South Eastern Railway (UK) stations
Railway stations in Great Britain opened in 1849
Railway stations served by Southeastern
Woolwich
1849 establishments in England
Railway stations located underground in the United Kingdom
Unbuilt London Underground stations
Proposed London Underground stations
Railway stations served by Govia Thameslink Railway